The 1988 WTA Nice Open was a women's tennis tournament played on outdoor clay courts at the Nice Lawn Tennis Club, in Nice, France and was part of Tier V of the 1988 WTA Tour. The tournament ran from 11 July until 17 July 1988. First-seeded Sandra Cecchini won the singles title.

Finals

Singles

 Sandra Cecchini defeated  Nathalie Tauziat 7–5, 6–4
 It was Cecchini's 3rd title of the year and the 10th of her career.

Doubles

 Catherine Suire /  Catherine Tanvier defeated  Isabelle Demongeot /  Nathalie Tauziat 6–4, 4–6, 6–2
 It was Suire's 3rd title of the year and the 6th of her career. It was Tanvier's 1st title of the year and the 5th of her career.

External links
 WTA  tournament edition details
 ITF tournament edition details

WTA Nice Open
WTA Nice Open